Swiss Federal Railways (SBB; , CFF; , FFS) is the national railway company of Switzerland. It is usually referred to by the initials of its German, French, and Italian names, either as SBB CFF FFS, or used separately. The Romansh version of its name, Viafiers federalas svizras, is not officially used. The official English abbreviation is "SBB", instead of the English acronym such as "SFR", which stands for Swiss Federal Railways itself.

The company, founded in 1902, is headquartered in Bern. It used to be a government institution, but since 1999 it has been a special stock corporation whose shares are held by the Swiss Confederation and the Swiss cantons. It is currently the largest rail and transport company of Switzerland, and operates on most standard gauge lines of the Swiss network. It also heavily collaborates with most other transport companies of the country, such as the BLS, one of its main competitors, to provide fully integrated timetables with cyclic schedules.

SBB was ranked first among national European rail systems in the 2017 European Railway Performance Index for its intensity of use, quality of service, and safety rating. While many rail operators in continental Europe have emphasised the building of high-speed rail, SBB has invested in the reliability and quality of service of its conventional rail network, on both national and regional scales. In addition to passenger rail, SBB operates cargo and freight rail service, through its subsidiary SBB Cargo, and has large real estate holdings in Switzerland.

Organisation
Swiss Federal Railways is divided into three divisions and eight groups. The divisions manage the relevant operational businesses. These divisions are:
 Passenger traffic
 Infrastructure
 Real estate

The former division Cargo became an independent group company at the beginning of 2019.

SBB's eight groups manage the company and support the operational business of the divisions with service and support functions. These groups are:
 Finance
 HR
 IT
 Communications
 Corporate Development
 Safety & Quality
 Legal and Compliance
 Supply Chain Management

The corporation is led in an entrepreneurial manner. A performance agreement between Swiss Federal Railways and the Swiss Confederation defines the requirements and is updated every four years. At the same time the compensation rates per train and track-kilometre are defined.

A subsidiary, SBB GmbH, is responsible for passenger traffic in Germany. It operates the Wiesentalbahn and the Seehas services. Other subsidiaries are THURBO, RegionAlps, AlpTransit Gotthard AG, Cisalpino, and TiLo (the latter in conjunction with Italian authorities). Swiss Federal Railways hold significant shares of the Zentralbahn and Lyria SAS.

The Stiftung Historisches Erbe der SBB ("SBB Historic") was founded in 2002. This foundation takes care of historic rolling stock and runs a technical library in Bern, document and photographic archives, and the SBB poster collection.

Figures

All figures from 2021:

Length of railway network: 3,156 km in standard gauge and 103 km metre gauge
Percentage electrified routes: 100%
Employees: 33,943
Passengers carried per day: 0.88 million
Passenger-kilometer per inhabitant and year: 
Stations open to passengers: 795
Customer Punctuality: 91.9% of all passengers reached their destination - measured from departure station including any necessary changes - with less than 3 minutes of delay (either 2 or 1 minute delay, or on time)
Customer-weighted connection punctuality: 98.9%
Freight per year: 48 million tons
Stations with freight traffic: 193
Railway tunnels: 311
Railway Tunnels total length: 
Longest Tunnel:  (Gotthard Base Tunnel) world record
Railway Bridges: 4,925
Railway bridges total length: 
Electric multiple units (fixed compositions of power cars and coaches): 656
Power Cars: 108
Mainline locomotives: 543 (passenger services: 322 / freight services: 221)
Shunting locomotives: 224 (38/75/ infrastructure: 111)
Shunting tractors: 245 (18/24/203)
Passenger coaches: 1,982
Freight wagons: 4,671
Hydroelectric plants: 8
Electricity produced and procured: 3063 GWh
Electricity used for railway operations: 2,275 GWh
Proportion of traction current from renewable sources: 90.2%

The Swiss Federal Railways rail network is totally electrified. The metre gauge Brünigbahn was SBB's only non-standard gauge line, until it was out-sourced and merged with the Luzern-Stans-Engelberg-Bahn to form the Zentralbahn, in which SBB holds shares.

History

In the 19th century, all Swiss railways were owned by private ventures. The economic and political interests of these companies led to lines being built in parallel and some companies went bankrupt in the resulting competition. On 20 February 1898 the Swiss people agreed in a referendum to the creation of a state-owned railway company.

Later that year, the Federal Assembly approved the purchase of Schweizerische Centralbahn (SCB) to operate trains on behalf of the federal government. The first train running on the account of the Swiss Confederation ran during the night of New Year's Eve 1900/New Year's Day 1901 from Zurich via Bern to Geneva, and received a ceremonial welcome upon arriving in Bern. SBB's management board was first formed in mid-1901, and added Schweizerische Nordostbahn (NOB) to the system on 1 January 1902. This date is now observed as the "official" birthday of SBB.

The following railway companies were nationalised:
Aargauische Südbahn (ASB)
Bötzbergbahn (BöB)
Schweizerische Nordostbahn (NOB)
Schweizerische Centralbahn (SCB)
Toggenburgerbahn (TB)
Vereinigte Schweizerbahnen (VSB)
Tösstalbahn including the Wald-Rüti Railway (WR)
Wohlen-Bremgarten Railway (WB)
Jura-Simplon-Bahn (JS) including the Brünigbahn (the latter in 1903)

Other companies were included later, and the rail network was extended. It is still growing today.

On 1 January 1999 the Swiss Federal Railway has been excluded from the Federal Administration and became a fully state-owned (the federal state owns 100% of all shares) limited company regulated by public law.

First class compartments were discontinued on 3 June 1956, and second and third class accommodation was reclassified as first and second class, respectively.

In 1982 SBB introduced the Taktfahrplan ("clockface timetable"), with trains for certain destinations leaving every 60 minutes, greatly simplifying the timetable.

On 12 December 2004 the first phase of Bahn2000, an ambitious programme to improve the company's services, was put into effect. The core element was the Zurich-Bern-Basel triangle, where travel times between the cities was reduced to under one hour, resulting in good connections from these stations for most trains. Some connections between cities got two trains in each direction per hour or more, and the S-Bahn services were intensified to four or more trains per hour. Because of these changes 90% of the timetable was changed, 12% more trains were scheduled and travel times generally improved. It was the greatest timetable change since the introduction of the Taktfahrplan.

For this change to be possible, large parts of the infrastructure had to be modified and many stations were rebuilt, for instance the line from Ziegelbrücke to Sargans or Bern main station which got the "wave of Bern", a platform over the tracks to provide better access to the platforms and the city centre.

On 22 June 2005 a short circuit on a long-distance power transmission line in central Switzerland led to a chain reaction. The entire Swiss railway network was out of service during rush hour and an estimated 200,000 people and 1,500 trains were stuck at stations or somewhere on the track. It turned out that the SBB power transmission network was overloaded and did not provide enough redundancy to tolerate the shutdown of the four cable Amsteg-Steinen power line due to construction work. So, the power grid was split in two parts, the northern half being overloaded and the southern half having a load reduction for the SBB power plants are situated in the southern part (the Alps), while most of the power is needed in the northern part (the Swiss plateau). The situation led to high voltage fluctuations and finally breakdown and emergency shutdown of the entire power supply.

In the same year, the Swiss Federal Railways received the Wakker Prize, an award given out by the Swiss Heimatschutz (an institution aiming to preserve significant buildings), which is usually only granted to communes, for their extraordinary efforts. The Swiss Federal Railways have many listed buildings from well-known architects such as Herzog & de Meuron, Santiago Calatrava, and Max Vogt.

In May 2010, SBB's first integrated network control centre opened in Lausanne, to supervise all of SBB's network in the French-speaking part of Switzerland. Another integrated control centre will be opened in Zurich.

All trains and most buildings have been made non-smoking since the timetable change of 11 December 2005.

By the end of 2006, the corporation was handed over from the long-term CEO Benedikt Weibel to his successor Andreas Meyer.

On 13 January 2019, Bloomberg reported that SBB was in talks with German aviation company Lilium GmbH to create air taxis to carry customers from train stations to their final destination.

Clock

The Swiss Federal Railways clock designed by Hans Hilfiker has become a national icon. It is special in that it stops for just over a second at the end of each minute, to wait for a signal from the master clock which sets it going again — thus keeping all station clocks synchronised.

The clock owes its technology to the particular requirements of operating a railway. First, railway timetables do not list seconds; trains in Switzerland always leave the station on the full minute.  Secondly, all the clocks at a railway station have to run synchronously in order to show reliable time for both passengers and railway personnel anywhere on or around the station.

The station clocks in Switzerland are synchronized by receiving an electrical impulse from a central master clock at each full minute, advancing the minute hand by one minute. The second hand is driven by an electrical motor independent of the master clock. It requires only about 58.5 seconds to circle the face, then the hand pauses briefly at the top of the clock. It starts a new rotation as soon as it receives the next minute impulse from the master clock. This movement is emulated in some of the licensed timepieces made by Mondaine.

Rolling stock

Mainline locomotives
Steam engines of the early days of the Swiss Federal Railways were, among others, the Ed 2x2/2, E 3/3, A 3/5, B 3/4 and C 5/6.

The first electric trial runs using single-phase alternating current were made in 1903 on the line Seebach – Wettingen together with the Maschinenfabrik Oerlikon (MFO), using the future Ce 4/4 locomotives ("Eva" and "Marianne"). The electrification of the network started 1919, motivated by the coal shortages during the First World War, and new electric locomotives were introduced: Ce 6/8 II/Ce 6/8 III "Crocodile" (1920–1926), Be 4/6 (1920), Be 4/7 (1921), Ae 3/6 I (1921), Ae 3/6 II (1924), Ae 3/6 III (1925), Ae 4/7 (1927) and Ae 4/6 (1941). A shift of paradigms happened in 1946, when the age of modern bogie-based locomotives without trailing axles started with the Re 4/4 I (1946), followed by the Ae 6/6 (1952), Re 4/4 II/Re 4/4 III (1964–1971), Re 6/6 (1972), Re 450 (1989) and Re 460/Re 465 "Lok 2000" (1992–1994).

The delivery of the last Re 465 marked the end of the Swiss locomotive industries with the closure of the Swiss Locomotive and Machine Works. The Swiss Federal Railways were split into three divisions: Passenger, Freight and Infrastructure, each with independent locomotive supply policies. Because the Passenger division got all modern Re 460s and opted for multiple unit trains, mainline locomotives were bought only by the Cargo division, namely Re 482 "Traxx F140 AC" (2002), Re 484 "Traxx F140 MS" (2004) and Re 474 "ES64 F4" (2004).

Multiple units

The first multiple units originated from the Seetalbahn, which was formed in 1922. Larger series were uncommon until after 1950: Be 4/6 (1923), De 4/4 (1927), BDe 4/4 (1952), RBe 4/4 (1959), RBDe 560 "NPZ" (1984) and RABe 520 "GTW" (2002).

The first multiple unit trainsets were bought for the introduction of the Taktfahrplan on the line Zurich–Meilen–Rapperswil in 1967: RABDe 12/12 "Mirage" (1965) and RABDe 8/16 "Chiquita" (1976). Multiple unit trainsets started to prevail in the 1990s, especially for commuter traffic: RABDe 500 "ICN" (1999), RABe 523 (et al.) "FLIRT" (2004), RABe 514 "DTZ" (2006), and RABe 503 (2008). While locomotive-hauled trains are rarely seen in commuter traffic nowadays, they are still the usual in intercity traffic. In 2011, Stadler's RABe 511 were introduced in Zurich's S-Bahn and in 2012 was introduced as a Regional Express between Geneva and Romont and Geneva and Vevey and Bern and Biel.

Some of the most popular historic multiple unit trainsets are the Roten Pfeile ("Red Arrows") (RAe 2/4) and the "Churchill-Pfeil" (RAe 4/8). In international traffic the Trans-Europ-Express (TEE) diesel trainsets appeared in 1957, but were replaced by four-systems electric trainsets RAe TEEII in 1961.

On 12 May 2010, the Swiss Federal Railways announced its largest order of rolling stock; buying 59 double-deck EMUs (Twindexx) from Bombardier, plus an option for another 100 trainsets. The new trains were originally intended to be delivered starting in 2012, but due to several delays, deliveries began in 2017 and end by 2020.

In addition, SBB has received and, as of 2016, is still in the process of delivering, New Pendolinos and has ordered 29 SMILEs, with an option for 92 more, expected to enter service in 2019.

Languages

SBB uses three official languages: German, French, and Italian. The Romansh-speaking regions in the canton of Grisons of Switzerland is served mostly by the Rhaetian Railway. Trains are branded "SBB CFF FFS".

Stations are named and signposted exclusively in the language of the locality. Stations of bilingual cities are named and signposted in both local languages (e.g. Biel/Bienne and Fribourg/Freiburg). The timetable only uses such official names regardless of the languages of the timetable.

Announcements in stations are usually made in local languages. However, in stations frequently used by foreigners (airports or tourism regions), in-station announcements are also made in English. On-board welcome announcements are made in all official languages of the regions served by that train, with the additional English ones onboard IC trains. Then the stops are announced in the pre-recorded local language of the town. For stations of bilingual cities, the language of announcement changes at the time of stop: when trains travelling from the French-speaking region to the German-speaking region via the bilingual city of Biel/Bienne, announcements are made in French until arriving at Bienne, and then switch to German after departing from Biel. Upon arriving at big hubs, the train conductor takes the microphone to announce in all official languages of the regions served by that train (plus English onboard IC trains) that the train is arriving, if the train is on time or not, and next connections at the station.

For instance, the main station in the German-speaking Zurich is signposted as Zürich HB (short for Zürich Hauptbahnhof) exclusively in German, while its French name (Zurich gare centrale), Italian name (Zurigo stazione centrale), and English name (Zurich Main Station) are used in websites and announcements in respective languages.

Since 2002, SBB has used Music in train announcements. The notes in the music correspond to the acronyms SBB CFF FFS, transposed by means of the German notes "Es - B - B" (E, B, B), "C - F - F" (C, F, F) and "F - F - Es" (F, F, E). For the German acronym, as there is no "S" note, the "Es" was used. And for the last letter, it is the B/G chord that is played. The melody is played on a vibraphone.

Services

Train services

SBB has the following services:

 R: Regio (Regionalzug): stops at all stations
 S: S-Bahn (commuter train): organized as a rapid transit system in major agglomerations, with several lines and generally high frequent service.
 RE: RegioExpress: local trains to access within a region.
 IR: InterRegio: are the workhorses of Swiss transit. They reach across two or three cantons, for instance from Geneva, along Lake Geneva through Vaud, and all the way to Brig at the far end of the Valais.
 IC: InterCity: stops at major cities (Geneva, Lausanne, Fribourg etc.). For the 2017–2018 timetable, the SBB gave numbers to all IC and IR lines.
 ICN: InterCity Tilting Train Similar to the IC, but using tilting trains instead of standard/double-decked trains. The ICN designation was discontinued as of 10 December 2017, with former ICN services now being branded as IC, but still run by tilting trains.

EXT: Charter train or special train added when an exceptionally heavy traffic is expected.

Regional trains are sometimes operated by another Swiss railways operator (for example, the Bern S-Bahn services operated by the BLS AG.)

SBB also operates international EuroCity and EuroNight trains while within Switzerland, while Deutsche Bahn operates InterCityExpress services to, from, and (a few services) within the country serving Swiss cities such as Interlaken, Bern, Basel, Zürich, and Chur. Under the name TGV Lyria the French railway company SNCF operates TGV connections to Switzerland. Lyria SAS, a company established under French law, is a subsidiary of the Société Nationale des Chemins de Fer Français (SNCF – French National Railway Company) which owns 74%, and the Chemins de Fer Fédéraux Suisses (CFF – Swiss Federal Railways) which owns 26%. TGV Lyria serves several Swiss cities including Geneva, Lausanne, Basel, Zürich, Bern, and Interlaken. It also provides services to certain locations including Brig in the Valais especially during the winter season to provide a connection for tourists mainly visiting the south-eastern Swiss Alps. These connections are marketed under the name of TGV Lyria des Neiges.

Lines 
Since 2018, the SBB uses numbers and distinct colors for all its InterCity (IC) and InterRegio (IR) lines (like a subway network) to ease connections. The IC, IR and RE (RegioExpress) lines (including alternative routes) are as follows:

InterCity

InterRegio 
Lines IR26 (since 2020), IR35 (since 2021), and IR46 (since 2020) are jointly operated with Südostbahn (SOB).

Regio Express

Customer services
SBB offers additional services for customers. SBB Digital promotes new digital services for customers. For example, SBB started a collaboration with Uber, with the recruiting matchmaking service, Jacando, and their own co-working space in Zurich. SBB has won CRM awards in Switzerland for their SBB Digital activities.

Airline codeshare
 SBB codeshares with American Airlines, Swiss International Air Lines, and United Airlines out of Zurich Airport.

See also

 List of stock used by Swiss Federal Railways
 PostBus Switzerland
 Rail transport in Switzerland
 Public transport in Switzerland
 Gotthardbahn
 Gotthard Base Tunnel
 Lötschberg Base Tunnel
 Rail 2000
 NRLA

Notes and references

Notes

References

External links

English SBB website
We are SBB 
The SBB cargo website 
The CityNightLine website in German, Dutch, or English 

 
Rail transport in Switzerland
Transport in Switzerland
Railway companies established in 1902
Railteam
Government-owned companies of Switzerland
Federal Department of Environment, Transport, Energy and Communications
Companies owned by the federal government of Switzerland
Swiss companies established in 1902
Swiss brands